Mercy is the first solo album by Steve Jones, a former member of the Sex Pistols. The single "Mercy" was used in a Miami Vice episode called "Stone's War" and was also featured on the Miami Vice II soundtrack album. The song "With You or Without You" was used in, and is on the soundtrack for, Jonathan Demme's 1986 film Something Wild. "Raining in My Heart" was originally recorded as "When Dreaming Fails", a 1985 demo with Iggy Pop which they recorded at Olivier Ferrand's home studio in Hancock Park, Los Angeles. Jones added new lyrics. Jones reflected in 2017 that he doesn't like the song "Drugs Suck": "It's sounds like I'm preachy, I don't like being preachy, if people wanna get high, good, do your thing″.

Track listing
All songs by Steve Jones, except where indicated

Side one
"Mercy" – 5:04
"Give It Up" – 4:55
"That's Enough" – 4:05
"Raining in My Heart" – 5:33
"With You or Without You" – 4:29

Side two
"Pleasure and Pain" – 4:51
"Pretty Baby" – 6:01
"Drugs Suck" – 4:30
"Through the Night" – 4:43
"Love Letters" (Edward Heyman, Victor Young) – 2:57

Personnel
Steve Jones – lead vocals, guitars, bass guitar, co-producer
Mickey Curry, Jim Keltner – drums
Bob Rose, Kevin Savigar – keyboards

For his solo debut, Jones chose a sparse arrangement and played most instruments himself. He partners with just two drummers and a keyboardist as he "gamely sing-speaks his way through".

Production
Bob Rose - producer
Paul Lani - producer on "Pretty Baby", engineer, mixing on "That's Enough" and "Through the Night"
Charlie Brocco, Cliff Kane, Jim Dineen - assistant engineers
Neil Dorfsman - mixing at The Village Recorder, Can-Am Recorders, One on One Recording Studios, Unique Recording Studios 
Greg Calbi - mastering at Sterling Sound, New York
Jim Shea - photography

Reception
Critic Ira Robbins notes that original punk rocker Jones "caught followers off guard" with this release. Unexpectedly, the album "allows low-key, sentimental moments – like the title track, the hopelessly sappy "Love Letters" and others – to mingle with the rock numbers".

References

1987 debut albums
MCA Records albums
Steve Jones (musician) albums
Albums produced by Paul Lani